Kalo Chorio Oreinis is a village located in the Nicosia District of Cyprus, 3 km south of the town of Klirou.

History
The village existence goes back as far as classical and Roman periods. According to the Cypriot historian Simon Menardos the old name of the village was dedicated to a pagan God. Evidence to that are the ruins of a temple and a remnant of an ancient altar on the site (Ζυθκιόνας). As practice of pagan religion was prohibited by law around 400 AD soldiers and clerics based in klirou garrison attacked and destroyed the temple. The villagers out of fear and with a gesture of genuflection welcome the marching army and clerics laying branches of shrubs call merika (Tamaricaceae). The clerics used that as an example when preaching Christianity hence the name came to existence (good village) kalo horio also known as (kalo horio merikas) and kalo horio klirous.

References

External links
kalochoriooreinis.org

Gallery

Communities in Nicosia District